IAM may refer to:

Concepts
Identity and access management, a concept that combines business processes, policies and technologies
Indo-Aryan migration, the theory that speakers of Indo-Aryan languages migrated into the Indian subcontinent during the 2nd millennium BCE

Groups
Maroc Telecom (Arabic transliteration: Ittisalat Al Maghrib), the main telecommunication company in Morocco
International Association of Machinists and Aerospace Workers, a North American labor union
Institute of Advanced Motorists, a charity based in the UK with the objective of improving car-driving and motorcycle-riding standards
Institute of Asset Management, a professional body for asset managers
International Assistance Mission, an NGO working in Afghanistan since 1966
RAF Institute of Aviation Medicine, a British Royal Air Force aviation medicine research unit between 1945 and 1994
International Academy of Macomb, an International Baccalaureate school based in Macomb County, Michigan, U.S.
Institute of Administrative Management, a UK awarding organisation and professional membership body for administrative and business managers
Islamic Association of Macau, an Islamic organization in Macau
Municipal Affairs Bureau, a government department of Macau

Music
IAM (band), a French hip hop group from Marseille that formed in 1989
I Am (American band), often styled I AM, an American rock band

Other uses
Intellectual Asset Management, an intellectual-property magazine
Internal auditory meatus, a canal in the temporal bone of the skull that carries nerves from inside the cranium towards the middle and inner-ear compartments
IAM.BMEzine, a blogging website for members of BMEzine
Integrated assessment modelling, a type of scientific modelling
Iam, Caraș-Severin, a village in Berliște Commune, Caraş-Severin County, Romania
 IAM Cycling, a UCI WorldTour cycling team
Iams, the brand-name for dog-food and cat-food manufactured by Procter & Gamble after acquiring the Iams Company in 1999

People
Master I. A. M. of Zwolle (c. 1440–1504), 15th-century Dutch printmaker
 Iulia Antoanella Motoc, judge at the European Court of Human Rights

See also
I Am (disambiguation)
1 A.M. (disambiguation)